The 1991 Umaglesi Liga was the second season of top-tier football in Georgia. It began on 16 March and ended on 28 June 1991. In that season, Georgia was declared the independence from Soviet Union in April 1991, so the championship became national. The season was a transitional because from following season the schedule was changed to the autumn-spring schedule. Iberia Tbilisi were the defending champions.

Locations

League standings

Results

Relegation play-offs

Top goalscorers

See also
1991 Pirveli Liga

References
Georgia - List of final tables (RSSSF)

Erovnuli Liga seasons
1
Georgia